Ritenour High School is a public high school in Breckenridge Hills, St. Louis County, Missouri that is part of the Ritenour School District.

Activities
For the 2013–2014 school year, the school offered 25 activities approved by the Missouri State High School Activities Association (MSHSAA): baseball, boys and girls basketball, sideline cheerleading, boys and girls cross country, dance team, 11-man football, boys and girls golf, music activities, boys and girls soccer, softball, speech and debate, boys and girls swimming and diving, boys and girls tennis, boys and girls track and field, boys and girls volleyball, and wrestling. In addition to its MSHSAA-sanctioned activities, the school offers students an opportunity to participate in a variety of school-sponsored clubs. The school also maintains the only fully operational high school radio station in Missouri.

Ritenour students have won several state championships, including:
Baseball: 1957, 1966, 1967
Boys track and field: 1985, 1989
Wrestling: 1948, 1949, 1950, 1951, 1952, 1953, 1954, 1955, 1956, 1957, 1958, 1959, 1960, 1961, 1963, 1974

Ritenour High School is one of two high schools in the St. Louis Area to operate its own functional radio station, KRHS 90.1 FM.

Alumni

Ron Hunt: Major League Baseball player
Jerry Reuss: Major League Baseball player
Bill Chott: actor
Wendell Bryant:  NFL player
DeRon Jenkins: NFL player
Cal Heeter: professional hockey player
Bob Scheffing:  Major League Baseball player

References

High schools in St. Louis County, Missouri
Public high schools in Missouri
1911 establishments in Missouri
Buildings and structures in St. Louis County, Missouri